The Wait may refer to:

The Wait (ZOX album), a 2006 album by Zox
The Wait, a 2014 album by Phase 
The Wait (Vika and Linda album), a 2021 album by Vika and Linda
The Wait (Tebey album), an album by Tebey
"The Wait", a song by Built to Spill from their album You in Reverse
"The Wait" (song), a song by Killing Joke
"The Wait", a song by The Pretenders from their album The Pretenders
"The Wait", a song by The American Analog Set from their 1999 album The Golden Band
"The Wait" (short story), a short story by Argentine writer Jorge Luis Borges
The Wait (2013 film), an American film by M. Blash
The Wait (2015 film), an Italian film
The Wait (2021 film), a Nigerian film

See also
 "The Weight", an influential song by The Band and covered by various other artists